Lassaâd Ouertani aka "Zgaw"  (2 May 1980 – 4 January 2013) was a Tunisian football player who played for Jeunesse Sportive Kairouanaise, Stade Tunisien, Club Africain, ES Zarzis before returning to Jeunesse Sportive Kairouanaise.

He died in a traffic accident.

References

1980 births
Tunisian footballers
Tunisia international footballers
2013 deaths
Road incident deaths in Tunisia
Club Africain players
ES Zarzis players
People from Kairouan
JS Kairouan players
Stade Tunisien players
Association football midfielders
Mediterranean Games gold medalists for Tunisia
Mediterranean Games medalists in football
Competitors at the 2001 Mediterranean Games
21st-century Tunisian people